Baldwin is a former unincorporated community in Fayetteville Township, Washington County, Arkansas, United States. It has since been annexed by Fayetteville. It is located in east Fayetteville along Huntsville Road near Lake Sequoyah toward Elkins.

References

Unincorporated communities in Washington County, Arkansas
Unincorporated communities in Arkansas